Tounkara is a surname. Notable people with the surname include:

Balla Tounkara, Malian musician
Djelimady Tounkara, Malian musician
Fodé Tounkara (1985–1999), Guinean stowaway
Ibrahim Tounkara (born 1976), Canadian football player
Maakan Tounkara (born 1983), French handball player
Mamadou Tounkara (born 1996), Spanish footballer
Oumare Tounkara (born 1990), French footballer
Ousmane Tounkara (born 1973), Canadian football player